Dog Lake is a lake in Le Sueur County, Minnesota

References

Lakes of Minnesota
Lakes of Le Sueur County, Minnesota